is the name of many castles in Japan.

 Kameyama Castle (Aichi) in Shinshiro, Aichi Prefecture (formerly Mikawa Province)
 Kameyama Castle (Mie) in Kameyama, Mie Prefecture (formerly Ise Province)
 Kameyama Castle (Kyoto) in Kameoka, Kyoto Prefecture (formerly Tanba Province)
 Kameyama Castle (Okayama) in Okayama, Okayama Prefecture (formerly Bizen Province)
 Kameyama Castle (Wakayama) in Gobō, Wakayama Prefecture (formerly Kii Province)
 Kameyama Castle (Yamaguchi) in Nagato, Yamaguchi Prefecture (formerly Nagato Province)

Kameyama Castle is also an alternate name for the following castles:
 Ōno Castle (Echizen Province) in Ōno, Fukui Prefecture (formerly Echizen Province)
 Marugame Castle in Marugame, Kagawa Prefecture (formerly Sanuki Province)
 Hamada Castle in Hamada, Shimane Prefecture (formerly Iwami Province)
 Tsuzurao Castle in Tottori, Tottori Prefecture (formerly Inaba Province)